

Manavhela Ben Lavin Nature Reserve is a nature reserve located close to Louis Trichardt, in the Limpopo province of South Africa.

Wildlife 
There is no dangerous wildlife known to live in the reserve.

Archeological value 
The Reserve is of archaeological interest, and contains a series of ruins that date back to 1250 AD.

See also 
 Protected areas of South Africa

Nature reserves in South Africa
Limpopo Provincial Parks